Events from the year 1932 in Sweden

Incumbents
 Monarch - Gustaf V
 Prime Minister - Carl Gustaf Ekman, Felix Hamrin, and Per Albin Hansson

Events

 7 March - Von Sydow murders
 The Social Democrats formed a coalition with the Agrarian Party. Unemployment was reduced by efforts that bolstered the agricultural sector.

Births

Deaths

 8 February - Maria Stenkula, educational reformer (born 1842)
 Augusta Jansson, entrepreneur (born 1859)

References

 
Portugal
Years of the 20th century in Sweden